Social Science & Medicine is a peer-reviewed academic journal covering social science research on health, including anthropology, economics, geography, psychology, social epidemiology, social policy, sociology, medicine and health care practice, policy, and organization. It was established in 1967 and is published by Elsevier.

History 
Social Science & Medicine was published quarterly from 1967 to 1977 by Pergamon Press and, according to the National Library of Medicine and the Library of Congress, was then split into:

 Social Science & Medicine. Part A: Medical Psychology & Medical Sociology
 Social Science & Medicine. Part B: Medical Anthropology
 Social Science & Medicine. Part C: Medical Economics
 Social Science & Medicine. Part D: Medical Geography
 Social Science & Medicine. Part E: Medical Psychology
 Social Science & Medicine. Part F: Medical & Social Ethics

In 1982, Parts A-F were merged back into one journal. It was published by Pergamon Press, until that company was acquired by Elsevier in 1992.

Editors-in-Chief 
2012 to Current – Ichiro Kawachi and S.V. Subramanian, both at Harvard T.H. Chan School of Public Health, US. 

2004 to 2012 – Ellen Annandale, currently Department of Sociology, University of York, UK.

1995 to 2004 - Sally Macintyre, MRC / CSO Social and Public Health Sciences Unit, University of Glasgow, UK.

1967 to 1995 - Peter J. M. McEwan (Founding Editor).

Abstracting and indexing 
The journal is abstracted and indexed in:

According to the Journal Citation Reports, the journal has a 2021 impact factor of 5.379.

See also 
Occupational health psychology

References

External links 
 

Publications established in 1967
Sociology journals
Elsevier academic journals
Healthcare journals
Biweekly journals
English-language journals